Delayed gadolinium-enhanced magnetic resonance imaging of cartilage or dGEMRIC measures the fixed-charge density and relative proteoglycan content of articular cartilage using the spin-lattice relaxation time or T1 relaxation time. Current research is investigating the clinical application of dGEMRIC as a quantitative tool for monitoring cartilage function in diseased or repair cartilage.

References

External links
The Impact of the Relaxivity Definition on the Quantitative Measurement of Glycosaminoglycans in Cartilage by MRI dGEMRIC Method
Delayed Gadolinium-enhanced MR Imaging of Articular Cartilage: Three-dimensional T1 Mapping with Variable Flip Angles and B1 Correction
Toward Imaging Biomarkers for Glycosaminoglycans
Longitudinal Evaluation of Cartilage Composition of Matrix-Associated Autologous Chondrocyte Transplants with 3-T Delayed Gadolinium-Enhanced MRI of Cartilage
Association between findings on delayed gadolinium-enhanced magnetic resonance imaging of cartilage and future knee osteoarthritis
Delayed Gadolinium-enhanced MR to Determine Glycosaminoglycan Concentration in Reparative Cartilage after Autologous Chondrocyte Implantation: Preliminary Results
Glycosaminoglycan Distribution in Cartilage as Determined by Delayed Gadolinium-Enhanced MRI of Cartilage (dGEMRIC): Potential Clinical Applications

Magnetic resonance imaging